RAD140 is an investigational selective androgen receptor modulator (SARM) that is developed by Radius Health, Inc. for use in androgen replacement therapy. It was licensed to Ellipses Pharmaceuticals in 2020. Some of the potential benefits under investigation are for the treatment of conditions such as muscle wasting and bone loss.

Clinical trials 
The first-in-human study was initiated in October of 2017 and completed in September 2020 in postmenopausal women with breast cancer.

In early 2020 a single case report of drug-induced liver injury following use of RAD 140 was published.

Animal studies 
RAD 140 appears to be safer than testosterone replacement therapy (TRT) in rats.

RAD 140 slightly increased lean muscle mass when used in primates, by targeting androgen receptors in skeletal tissue.

See also 
 AC-262,356
 BMS-564,929
 Enobosarm
 LGD-2226
 LGD-4033
 S-23
 S-40503

References 

Chloroarenes
Designer drugs
Nitriles
Selective androgen receptor modulators